Tamna, officially State of Tamna, was a kingdom based on Jeju Island from ancient times until it was absorbed by the Korean Joseon dynasty in 1404, following a long period of being a tributary state or autonomous administrative region of various Korean kingdoms. The Go (Jeju) clan is the family name of the Grand Duke (Seongju, 성주, 星主), that ruled West Tamna over 400 years. The Moon (Nampyeong) clan is the family name of the Grand Prince (Wangja, 왕자, 王子), that ruled East Tamna for 400 years. The Kingdom of Tamna is also sometimes known as Tangna (탕나), Seomna (섬나), and Tammora (탐모라). All of these names mean "island country".

Legends of founding

There is no discovered historical record of the founding or early history of Tamna. One legend tells that the three divine founders of the country—Go (고), Yang (양), and Bu (부)—emerged from three holes in the ground in the 24th century BC. These holes, known as the Samseonghyeol (삼성혈), are still preserved in Jeju City.

According to legend, after Yang Eulna (양을나/楊乙那) came to Jeju Island, a semi-mythical box washed up on the shore of the island. Yang Ul-la searched in the box and found three women, horses, cows, and agricultural seeds such as rice, corn, grain, millet, barley, and bamboo. From these beginnings, the three men established the kingdom of Tamna. He is regarded as the legendary ancestor of Yang Tang, the founder of the Jeju Yang bon-gwan.

Historical and archaeological records
Archaeological evidence indicates that the people of Tamna were engaging in active trade with Han China and Yayoi Japan, South-east-Asian nations, with the Tamil Chola dynasty, as well as Korea, by the 1st century AD. The first historical reference to the kingdom may come in the 3rd century AD, in the chronicle of the Chinese Three Kingdoms period called the Sanguozhi.  The Sanguozhi reports a strange people living on a large island near Korea, which it calls Juho (州胡, Late Han Chinese tɕu-ga, literally "island barbarians"). These people, who had a distinctive language and culture, engaged in trade with the Mahan people of the mainland.  However, the identity of Juho with Tamna has been disputed by authorities such as the North Korean scholar Lee Ch'i-rin (이지린), who claims that Juho was a small island in the Yellow Sea. Tamna is pronounced Dānluó (Wade-Giles: Tan1-luo2) in Standard Mandarin Chinese.

In 476, according to the Samguk Sagi, Tamna entered into a tributary relationship with Baekje, which controlled the southwestern Korean peninsula as Tamna gave military aide with some sort of money, and enjoyed strong ties with Japan. It was thus a natural partner for Tamna.  As Baekje waned, Tamna turned to Silla instead. At some point near the end of the Three Kingdoms period, Tamna officially subjugated itself to Silla. Silla then conferred on the three princes of Tamna the titles which they would hold for the remainder of the kingdom's history:  Seongju (성주, 星主), Wangja (왕자, 王子), and Donae (도내, 都內). Some sources indicate that this took place during the reign of King Munmu of Silla in the late 7th century AD.

Tamna briefly reclaimed its independence after the fall of Silla in 935. However, it was subjugated by the Goryeo dynasty in 938, and officially annexed in 1105. However, the kingdom maintained local autonomy until 1404, when Taejong of Joseon placed it under firm central control and brought the Tamna kingdom to an end. One interesting event that took place during these later years of Tamna was the Sambyeolcho Rebellion, which came to a bloody end on Jeju Island in 1274.

Alexander Vovin (2013) notes that the old name for Jeju Island is tammura, which can be analyzed in Japanese as tani mura たにむら ( 'valley settlement') or tami mura たみむら ( 'people's settlement'). Thus, Vovin concludes that Japonic speakers were present on Jeju Island before being replaced by Koreanic speakers sometime before the 15th century.

Sovereigns and governors of Tamna 
The Go clan is the family name of the kings that ruled Tamna, and the first king was one of the three who emerged from the ground. His descendants became the future kings and governors of Tamna.

Sovereigns and governors of West Tamna 
The Go(Jeju) clan is the family name of the Grand Duke(Seongju, 성주, 星主), that ruled West Tamna.

*Based on Tamnaji(탐라지, 耽羅志), Goryeosa(고려사, 高麗史) and The Veritable Records of Joseon Dynasty (조선왕조실록, 朝鮮王朝實錄)

Sovereigns and governors of East Tamna 
The Moon(Nampyeong) clan is the family name of the Grand Prince(Wangja, 왕자, 王子), that ruled East Tamna.

*Based on Tamnaji(탐라지, 耽羅志), Goryeosa(고려사, 高麗史) and The Veritable Records of Joseon Dynasty (조선왕조실록, 朝鮮王朝實錄)

See also
History of Korea
Three Kingdoms of Korea

References

External links
Naver Encyclopedia article (in Korean)
Jeju Government's History and Culture of Tamna site (in English)

 
Ancient peoples
Former countries in East Asia
1100s disestablishments in Asia
Former monarchies of East Asia